Tomlinsonus is an extinct genus of marellomorph arthropod known from the Late Ordovician (Katian) Kirkfield Formation of Ontario, Canada. It is a member of Marellida, and closely related to Mimetaster.

Description 
Only a single partial specimen (ROMIP 66233) was recovered during fieldwork in September 2020, by independent researcher Marc Haensel. This specimen preserves a mostly complete head and some appendages. Like other marellids, the head is composed of a cephalic shield with pairs of spine-like projections, with two large pairs present in Tomlinsonus. These projections curve posteriorly. Like most other marellids, these projections are covered in second-order spines. There is also a pair of smaller projections without spines extending posteriorly from the back of the head. There is also another, shorter moderately sized cephalic appendage with at least four podomeres, with fourth and distalmost podomere being triangular in shape. There were pairs of filamentous appendages running along the trunk.

Taxonomy 
In a phylogenetic analysis Tomlinsonus was found a member of Mimetasteridae, as the closest known relative of Mimetaster hexagonalis, with which it shares an enlarged uniramous first appendage, with the supposed Argentinian Mimetaster species "M." florestaensis found to be more closely related to Furca.

Ecology 
The depositional environment of the Kirkfield Formation was an open marine carbonate platform. Tomlinsonus was likely a slowly moving animal that lived on the seafloor. It likely used the large first appendage pair to lift itself up off the substrate, and may have rested plantigrade on the 9th podomere to spread its bodyweight, while using its trunk biramous appendages to propel itself forwards.

References 

Marrellomorpha
Fossil taxa described in 2022
Ordovician Ontario
Fossils of Canada
Monotypic arthropod genera